Elgin is a city in northeastern Comanche County, Oklahoma, United States. The population was 2,156 at the 2010 census, a 78 percent increase from 1,210 at the 2000 census. It is included in the Lawton, Oklahoma Metropolitan Statistical Area. It is the site of Fort Sill National Cemetery.

History
Elgin developed as the Oklahoma City and Western Railroad (OCWR) (later absorbed by the St. Louis–San Francisco Railway) constructed a line from Chickasha, Oklahoma to Lawton, Oklahoma between 1901 and 1903. A post office was established in April 1902 and named "Ceegee", derived from Charles G. Jones, president of the OCWR and developer of the town. The railroad management objected to this name and demanded that it be changed. This was done in July 1902.

Geography
Elgin is located at  (34.780906, -98.292862).

Climate
Climate is characterized by relatively high temperatures and evenly distributed precipitation throughout the year.  The Köppen Climate Classification subtype for this climate is "Cfa" (Humid Subtropical Climate).

Demographics

As of the census of 2010, there were 2,156 people, 759 households, and 619 families residing in the city. The population density was 582.3 people per square mile (224.5/km2). There were 759 housing units at an average density of 205.1 per square mile (79.1/km2). The racial makeup of the city was 78.8% White, 4.7% African American, 8.6% Native American, 1.3% Asian, 0.3% Pacific Islander, 1.2% from other races, and 5.2% from two or more races. Hispanic or Latino of any race were 8.5% of the population.

There were 759 households, out of which 44.0% had children under the age of 18 living with them, 63.4% were married couples living together, 13.7% had a female householder with no husband present, and 18.4% were non-families. 16.2% of all households were made up of individuals, and 16.2% had someone living alone who was 65 years of age or older. The average household size was 2.84 and the average family size was 3.16.

In the city, the population was spread out, with 32.0% under the age of 18, 7.1% from 18 to 24, 31.5% from 25 to 44, 19.5% from 45 to 64, and 9.9% who were 65 years of age or older. The median age was 32.6 years. For every 100 females, there were 95.5 males. For every 100 females age 18 and over, there were 107.2 males.

According to the 2000 census, the median income for a household in the city was $36,324, and the median income for a family was $44,125. Males had a median income of $32,019 versus $22,614 for females. The per capita income for the city was $14,264. About 7.4% of families and 9.7% of the population were below the poverty line, including 11.2% of those under age 18 and 12.6% of those age 65 or over.

Utilities 

 Telephone, Internet, and Digital TV Services is provided by Hilliary Communications.
 Elgin supplies municipal water from the Rush Springs aquifer, via four wells east of town.  Elgin maintains a sewage lagoon east of town, the billing for which is included on the water bill.  Garbage collection service is through the Multiple Community Services Authority and is also included on the water bill.
 Electric service is provided by American Electric Power Public Service Company of Oklahoma.
 Natural gas service is provided by Arkla Gas.

See also
 Elgin Public Schools

References

External links
 Encyclopedia of Oklahoma History and Culture - Elgin

Cities in Oklahoma
Cities in Comanche County, Oklahoma
County seats in Oklahoma
Populated places established in 1902